Carolyn Ferrell (born 1962, Brooklyn, New York) is an American short story writer and novelist.

Life
Ferrell graduated from Sarah Lawrence College, and City College of New York with an MA.
She has lived, worked, and studied in West Berlin, Manhattan, and the South Bronx.
She is married to and has children with psychology professor Linwood Lewis.

Her work has appeared in The Literary Review, Callaloo, Fiction, and Sojourner: The Women’s Forum.

She teaches writing at Sarah Lawrence College. Sarah Lawrence College

Awards
 1997 John C. Zacharis First Book Award

Works

Dear Miss Metropolitan. Holt. 2021. ISBN 9781250793614.

Anthologies

Ploughshares
"Proper Library", Ploughshares, Spring 1993 
"Tiger Frame Glasses ", Ploughshares, Spring 1997

References

1962 births
American short story writers
People from Brooklyn
Sarah Lawrence College alumni
City College of New York alumni
Sarah Lawrence College faculty
Living people